The 1882 college football season had no clear-cut champion, with the Official NCAA Division I Football Records Book listing Yale as having been selected national champions.

Conference standings

References